Vacuolar protein sorting-associated protein VTA1 homolog is a protein that in humans is encoded by the VTA1 gene.

References

Further reading